MOAA may refer to:
 Military Officers Association of America
 Cyclic pyranopterin monophosphate synthase, an enzyme